Maidstone is a suburb in Melbourne, Victoria, Australia,  north-west of Melbourne's Central Business District, located with the City of Maribyrnong local government area.

The suburb predominantly consists of residential areas. A large chunk of the north-western corner encompasses a private golf club and there is a small industrial zone in the centre. Maidstone is bounded by Suffolk Street to the south, Ashley Street to the west, along Summerhill Road and Rosamond Road to the east, and along Williamson Road and Rosamond Road to the north and north-east.

History

Maidstone was established in 1858. It was given the name after the town of Maidstone in Kent, England.

Maidstone was predominantly made up of period weatherboard, brick Art Deco and Californian Bungalow houses constructed between the 1920s and 1940s. Concrete houses built in the late 1940s to house the families of returned servicemen from World War II are also found. From the early 1990s many old factory sites in Maidstone have been turned into new housing estates comprising hundreds of houses and townhouses. Maidstone's recent development boost, good public transport availability and close proximity to the CBD has also seen the median house price escalate dramatically over the past 10 years.

Parks and recreational spaces
 Shepherd Gardens
 Maidstone Tennis Club
 Medway Golf Club (private)
 Suffolk Triangle Park
 Drey Park
 Ulmara Park
 Chislon Reserve
 Scovell Reserve Oval
 Rogers Reserve
 Dobson Reserve Oval and Playground
 Cambridge Reserve
 Magnolia Path
 Johnson Reserve and Roberta Tennis Club (just south of Maidstone)
 Martin Reserve Dog Park (south of Maidstone)
 Shorten Reserve Oval (south of Maidstone)
 Maribyrnong River

Features
 Maidstone Tennis Club
 Maribyrnong River
 Maribyrnong River Trail
 Medway Golf Club
 The Palms Bingo and Club
 Highpoint Shopping Centre (just north of Maidstone)
 Footscray Hospital (just east of Maidstone)
 One for the Crow café

Education
 Maribyrnong College (est 1958), located in Maribyrnong on the border of Maidstone and Maribyrnong.
 Footscray North Primary School (est 1922), located in Footscray on the border of Maidstone and Footscray.
 Footscray West Primary School (just south of Maidstone)
 Dobson Kindergarten
 North Maidstone Preschool Play Centre
 Little VIPs Childcare Centre
 Australian Childcare Diary
 Explorers Early Learning Maidstone
 St Vincent's School

Sports and fitness
 Maidstone United Soccer Club (formally Leros United Soccer Club) (Scovell Reserve)
 Sunshine George Cross Juniors Soccer Club (Dobson Reserve)
 Rosamond Bowling Club
 Rosamond Tennis Club (Footscray North Primary School)
 Maidstone Tennis Club
 Maidstone Junior Sporting Club (As above)
 Footscray United Cricket Club (Scovell Reserve)
 Rosamond Bowling Club
 Golfers play at the course of the Medway Golf Club on Omar Street.
 Genesis Maidstone Gym
 FIT CENTRE
 Commercial St Dance Studio
 Cia Paulista Australia BJJ – Maribyrnong
 Zoom Fitness 24/7 – Gym (just east of Maidstone)
 Club Fitbox

Places of worship
 Our Lady's Catholic Church is a landmark building established in 1962, located on Ballarat Road.
 Al-Noor Mosque in Maidstone is the second oldest mosque in Melbourne and one of the oldest in Australia.
 Hillsong Church
 New Apostolic Church
 Maidstone Church of Christ
 Iglesia Ni Cristo

Transport

Tram route 57 tram provides public transport from Flinders Street station in the city to Cordite Avenue, West Maribyrnong, on the border of Maidstone, while tram route 82 tram provides public transport from Moonee Ponds Junction (Ascot Vale Road / Puckle Street) to Footscray (Leeds Street / Irving Street) passing through Maidstone for a segment of its journey. It is one of very few Melbourne tram routes which do not travel through the Melbourne CBD. In 2022, construction of the Maidstone tram depot is scheduled to commence.

West Footscray and Tottenham train stations are the closest to Maidstone but many residents catch the bus to Footscray station (where trains are more frequent).

A number of different bus routes pass through Maidstone.

The Maribyrnong River Trail connects cyclists to the Footscray Road off-road path and into Docklands and the Melbourne CBD.

Flora and fauna

Many native species exist along the Maribyrnong River. Some species thrive in the area and often journey up and down river from Brimbank Park (5 km up river from Maidstone). The most abundant are;
 Rainbow lorikeet
 Common brushtail possum
 Black flying foxes or fruit bat Pteropus
 Cockatoo
 Galah

Notable people
 Albert Facey – Author of A Fortunate Life and Gallipoli veteran was born in Maidstone in 1894. He would leave Maidstone in 1898.  He has a street named after him in the eastern part of Maidstone.

See also
 City of Sunshine – Maidstone was previously within this former local government area.

References

External links
 Maidstone Suburb Profile
 Medway Golf Club
 Student Village
 Rosamond Bowling Club

Suburbs of Melbourne
Suburbs of the City of Maribyrnong